Rigby High School is a four-year public high school in the western United States, located in Rigby, Idaho. Part of the Jefferson County School District 251, the approximate enrollment is 2,000 students in grades 9 to 12, from Rigby and surrounding communities. The school colors of RHS are maroon, white, and gold, and the mascot is a Trojan.

History
Rigby High School was established  in 1912, with the first graduation in 1916. The school was originally located near Rigby City Park. The mascot was originally a Red Devil, and the school colors were red and white. It wasn't until the early 1950s, when a high school located in the smaller, neighboring town of Menan burnt down and its students came to Rigby, that the school was given the mascot of the Trojans.

In the sixties and seventies the high school was replaced with a new building located west of down town Rigby, which became Rigby Junior High, but is now an empty lot. Also in the 1960s, Rigby High School gained more students from the smaller high school of Roberts. Since 1988, Rigby High resided just west of the city limits, but now has a new high school which was finished in 2013. The new building now houses grades 9 through 12 is located immediately to the east of the old high school building, which is now the Middle School and houses grades 6 through 8. As of 2016, the school principal is Bryan Lords.

Athletics
Rigby competes in athletics in Idaho High School Activities Association (IHSAA) Class 5A, the highest classification in the state. It is a member of the High Country Conference. It also has an extended history of successful basketball teams. Rigby returned to Class 5A in 2016.

State titles

Boys
 Basketball (9): (A-2, now 3A) 1977, 1978, 1982, 1983, 1984, 1986; (A-1, now 5A) 1987; (4A) 2012, 2013, 2015
 High School Football (3) 2019, 2021, 2022
 Track (4): (A-1, now 5A) 1999; (4A) 1999, 2010, 2011, 2012

Girls
 Track (3): (4A) 2007, 2008, 2009

Notable alumni

 Philo Farnsworth, inventor and television pioneer
 Vardis Fisher, author
 Rod Furniss, businessman and politician
 Larry Wilson, NFL player
 Jessika Jenson, snowboarder

References

External links

Educational institutions established in 1912
Public high schools in Idaho
Schools in Jefferson County, Idaho
1912 establishments in Idaho